Arumugam Namassivayam is an Indian politician from the Bharatiya Janata Party.

Political career 
He was the Ex-president of Puducherry Pradesh Congress Committee.
On January 25, 2021, he was suspended from the Congress party for his anti-party activities. Following that Namassivayam submitted his MLA resignation letter to the assembly speaker and quit Congress party.
He joined Bharathiya Janata Party along with his supporter Theeppainthan on 28 January 2021 in the presence of its national general secretary Arun Singh.

Notes

References

Bharatiya Janata Party politicians from Puducherry
Puducherry politicians
Living people
Year of birth missing (living people)
Puducherry MLAs 2016–2021
Puducherry MLAs 2021–2026
Indian National Congress politicians
Tamil Maanila Congress politicians
Marumalarchi Dravida Munnetra Kazhagam politicians
Dravida Munnetra Kazhagam politicians